Tsagaantsooj Enkhtur (born 17 October 1970) is a Mongolian international footballer. He made his first appearance for the Mongolia national football team in 2000.

International goals
Scores and results list Mongolia's goal tally first.

References

1970 births
Mongolian footballers
Mongolia international footballers
Erchim players
Living people
Association football defenders